The California Global Warming Solutions Act of 2016: emissions limit, or SB-32, is a California Senate bill expanding upon AB-32 to reduce  greenhouse gas (GHG) emissions. The lead author is Senator Fran Pavley and the principal co-author is Assemblymember Eduardo Garcia. SB-32 was signed into law on September 8, 2016, by Governor Edmund Gerald “Jerry” Brown Jr. SB-32 sets into law the mandated reduction target in GHG emissions as written into Executive Order B-30-15.

The Senate bill requires that there be a reduction in GHG emissions to 40% below the 1990 levels by 2030. Greenhouse gas emissions include carbon dioxide, methane, nitrous oxide, sulfur hexafluoride, hydrofluorocarbons, and perfluorocarbons. The California Air Resources Board (CARB) is responsible for ensuring that California meets this goal. The provisions of SB-32 were added to Section 38566 of the Health and Safety Code subsequent to the bill’s approval. The bill goes into effect January 1, 2017. SB-32 builds onto Assembly Bill (AB) 32 written by Senator Fran Pavley and Assembly Speaker Fabian Nunez passed into law on September 27, 2006. AB-32 required California to reduce greenhouse gas emissions to 1990 levels by 2020 and SB-32 continues that timeline to reach the targets set in Executive Order B-30-15. SB-32 provides another intermediate target between the 2020 and 2050 targets set in Executive Order S-3-05.

SB-32 was contingent on the passing of AB-197, which increases legislative oversight of CARB and is intended to ensure CARB must report to the Legislature. AB-197 also passed and was signed into law on September 8, 2016.

Background 

The global community recognized the climate trends most recently at the 21st yearly session of the Conference of Parties (COP 21) in Paris, where a universal commitment to reduce average “global temperature rise this century well below 2 degrees Celsius and to drive efforts to limit the temperature increase even further to 1.5 degrees Celsius above pre-industrial levels.” 

Climate science dictates that global warming of more than 2 °C would have serious consequences, beyond those already being experienced, such as an increase in the number of extreme climate events. In order to avoid a global average surface temperature increase of 2 °C, global GHG emissions need to be reduced by 40–70% by 2050 and carbon neutrality (i.e. zero emissions) needs to be reached by the end of the century at the latest.

The United States pledged at the Paris COP 21, “to achieve an economy-wide target of reducing its greenhouse gas emissions by 26–28% below its 2005 level in 2025 and to make best efforts to reduce its emissions by 28%”  Prior to the Paris agreements, which have not domestically been ratified by a two-thirds Senate vote, the US did not have any binding national GHG reduction targets.

In light of the uncertain federal requirements for GHG reductions, California has moved forward with statewide GHG reduction legislation. AB-32 and SB-32 establish aggressive near- and mid- term GHG reduction goals, respectively. Within the US, California is the second largest GHG emitter, accounting for approximately 7.7 percent of the national GHG emissions in 2012. Accordingly, California’s climate legislature can result in real reductions to the national GHG inventory and provide the framework for other states to achieve simultaneous economic growth and GHG reductions.

California has set reduction targets based on 1990 levels of GHG emissions. The 1990 emissions limit was initially set at 427 million metric tons of carbon dioxide equivalent (MMTCO2e), but was revised in 2014 to 431 MMTCO2e based on updated scientific reporting. In 2014, California emitted a total of 441.5 MMTCO2e, a reduction of over 1.5 million  MMTCO2e since 2012. It is believed that California will continue to reduce GHG emissions and meet the 2020 target. The 2030 reduction goal of 40% below 1990 levels equates to a target emissions rate of 258.6 MMTCO2e by 2030. The long-term emission reduction goal set forth in EO S-3-05 to reach 80% below 1990 levels by 2050 equates to a target emissions rate of 86.2 MMTCO2e by 2050.

Related regulations

Assembly Bill (AB) 197 
AB-197 was signed into legislation by Governor Jerry Brown on the same day as SB-32, September 8, 2016. AB-197 is directly related to SB-32 in that AB-197 contains language stating AB-197 is only operative if SB-32 is enacted and becomes law on or before January 1, 2017.

The provisions of AB-197 are intended to provide more legislative oversight of CARB by adding two new legislatively appointed non-voting members to the CARB Board, increasing the Legislature's role in the ARB Board's decisions. Additionally, AB-197 limits the term length of CARB Board members to six years. AB-197 also requires that CARB "protect the state's most impacted and disadvantaged communities … [and] consider the social costs of the emissions of greenhouse gases" in preparing plans to meet GHG reduction goals.

Executive Order B-30-15 
Executive Order (EO) B-30-15 was signed by Governor Jerry Brown in April 2015 that set an executive greenhouse gas emissions target for 2030 at 40% below 1990 levels.

Executive Order S-3-05 
EO S-3-05 was signed by Governor Arnold Schwarzenegger in June 2005 that set an executive greenhouse gas emissions target for 2050 at 80% below 1990 levels. While state legislation has not yet been passed regarding a 2050 statewide emissions target, this Executive Orders holds some weight. See Executive Order for more details.

Senate bill requirements 

SB-32 requires CARB to reduce greenhouse gas emissions to 40% below the 1990 levels by 2030. This bill gives CARB the authority to adopt regulations in order to achieve the maximum technology feasible to be the most cost-efficient way to reduce greenhouse gas emissions. They are also required to meet these goals in such a way that benefits the state’s most disadvantaged communities as they are “disproportionately impacted” by the effects of climate change, such as drought and flooding.

SB-32 does not state how California will or should reach emission reduction targets, but rather leaves it up to CARB to adopt rules and regulations “in an open public process” to “achieve the maximum, technologically feasible, and cost-effective greenhouse gas emissions reductions.” Under AB-32, CARB is required to publish an Update to the Scoping Plan every five years, detailing how CARB plans to meet emission reduction targets. The Second Update to the Scoping Plan is currently being prepared, and will be published in 2017. The Second Update to the Scoping Plan is required to incorporate 2030 target year goals.

Environmental justice 

Environmental justice is an important aspect of SB-32. SB-32 emphasizes the need for protecting the state’s most disadvantaged communities. The concerns brought up in the bill are that those communities are affected first and most often by the negative impacts of climate change, such as drought, heat, and flooding. SB-32 also emphasizes that disadvantaged communities are also disproportionately affected health-wise. While SB-32 does not specifically lay out a plan on how to address environmental justice issues that the authors wrote into the bill, the companion bill AB-197 does. AB-197 requires a committee to be formed and called the Joint Legislative Committee on Climate Change Policies (JLCCCP), which will be responsible, among other duties, for addressing and prioritizing the disadvantaged communities in California.

Fate of Cap-and-Trade under SB-32 and AB-197 
The California Cap-and-Trade program was created by CARB as a market mechanism to reach GHG emission reduction targets established in AB-32. There currently is a Cap-and-Trade program in California, though it is not directly required under SB-32, which simply establishes a clear emissions reduction goal.  In preparation of the Second Update to the Scoping Plan, CARB was presented with a study out of the University of Southern California and the University of California at Berkeley that found a tight correlation between the locations of polluting industries and of low-income communities. The environmental justice concerns associated with the cap-and-trade program could urge CARB to consider alternatives to the cap-and-trade market mechanism in the upcoming Scoping Plan.

Additionally, as part of AB-197, reports of emissions inventories for GHGs, criteria pollutants, and toxic air contaminants are required to be made public and updated at least once a year.

Criticisms 

Critics of SB-32 note that CARB has too much un-checked power in regulating California, and that the legislative branch should have more involvement. However, the passage of AB-197 assuaged many of these critics. Other critics of SB-32 argue that the cap-and-trade program is actually a tax, levied without a two-thirds vote of the Legislature. See Global Warming Solutions Act of 2006 for a discussion of the current legal challenges facing the cap-and-trade program. Still, further critics assert that the benefits of the CARB-favored cap-and-trade program are not shared equally by all Californians.  One preliminary report asserts that polluters who can afford to are continuing to pollute, buying their way out of making actual reductions. And those polluters tend to be located in or near low-income communities that are frequently also communities of color, where their continued emissions of particulate matter and the like are degrading residents’ health.

See also 
 Climate Change in California 
 Climate Change
 Kyoto Protocol
 Paris Agreement

References 

2006 in the environment
2016 in the environment
Air pollution in California
Climate of California
Greenhouse gas emissions in the United States
United States state environmental legislation